In mathematics, the Jacobi curve is a representation of an elliptic curve different from the usual one defined by the Weierstrass equation. Sometimes it is used in cryptography instead of the Weierstrass form because it can provide a defence against simple and differential power analysis style (SPA) attacks; it is possible, indeed, to use the general addition formula also for doubling a point on an elliptic curve of this form: in this way the two operations become indistinguishable from some side-channel information. The Jacobi curve also offers faster arithmetic compared to the Weierstrass curve.

The Jacobi curve can be of two types: the Jacobi intersection, that is given by an intersection of two surfaces, and the Jacobi quartic.

Elliptic Curves: Basics
Given an elliptic curve, it is possible to do some "operations" between its points: for example one can add two points P and Q obtaining the point P + Q that belongs to the curve ; given a point P on the elliptic curve, it is possible to "double" P, that means find [2]P = P + P (the square brackets are used to indicate [n]P, the point P added n times), and also find the negation of P, that means find –P. In this way, the points of an elliptic curve forms a group. Note that the identity element of the group operation is not a point on the affine plane, it only appears in the projective coordinates: then O = (0: 1: 0) is the "point at infinity", that is the neutral element in the group law. Adding and doubling formulas are useful also to compute [n]P, the n-th multiple of a point P on an elliptic curve: this operation is considered the most in elliptic curve cryptography.

An elliptic curve E, over a field K can be put in the Weierstrass form y2 = x3 + ax + b, with a, b in K. What will be of importance later are point of order 2, that is P on E such that [2]P = O and P ≠ O. If P = (p, 0) is a point on E, then it has order 2; more generally the points of order 2 correspond to the roots of the polynomial f(x) = x3 + ax + b.

From now on, we will use Ea,b to denote the elliptic curve with Weierstrass form y2 = x3 + ax + b.

If Ea,b is such that the cubic polynomial x3 + ax + b has three distinct roots in K and b = 0 we can write Ea,b in the Legendre normal form:
Ea,b: y2 = x(x + 1)(x + j)
In this case we have three points of order two: (0, 0), (–1, 0), (–j, 0). In this case we use the notation E[j]. Note that j can be expressed in terms of a, b.

Definition: Jacobi intersection
An elliptic curve in P3(K) can be represented as the intersection of two quadric surfaces:

 

It is possible to define the Jacobi form of an elliptic curve as the intersection of two quadrics. Let Ea,b be an elliptic curve in the Weierstrass form, we apply the following map to it:

 

We see that the following system of equations holds:

The curve E[j] corresponds to the following intersection of surfaces in P3(K):

.

The "special case", E[0], the elliptic curve has a double point and thus it is singular.

S1 is obtained by applying to E[j] the transformation:

ψ: E[j] → S1

Group law
For S1, the neutral element of the group is the point (0, 1, 1, 1), that is the image of O = (0: 1: 0) under ψ.

Addition and doubling
Given P1 = (X1, Y1, Z1, T1) and P2 = (X2, Y2, Z2, T2), two points on S1, the coordinates of the point P3 = P1 + P2 are:

 
 
 
 

These formulas are also valid for doubling: it sufficies to have P1 = P2. So adding or doubling points in S1 are operations that both require 16 multiplications plus one multiplication by a constant (k).

It is also possible to use the following formulas for doubling the point P1 and find P3 = [2]P1:

 
 
 
 

Using these formulas 8 multiplications are needed to double a point. However, there are even more efficient “strategies” for doubling that require only 7 multiplications. In this way it is possible to triple a point with 23  multiplications; indeed [3]P1 can be obtained by adding P1 with [2]P1 with a cost of 7 multiplications for [2]P1 and 16 for P1 + [2]P1

Example of addition and doubling
Let  K = R or C and consider the  case:

Consider the points  and : it is easy to verify that P1 and P2 belong to S1 (it is sufficient to see that these points satisfy both equations of the system S1).

Using the formulas given above for adding two points, the coordinates for P3, where P3 = P1 + P2 are:

 
 
 
 

With the formulas given above for doubling, it is possible to find the point P3 = [2]P1:

 
 
 
 

So, in this case P3 = [2]P1 = (0, 12, –12, 12).

Negation
Given the point P1 = (X1, Y1, Z1, T1) in S1, its negation is −P1 = (−X1, Y1, Z1, T1)

Addition and doubling in affine coordinates
Given two affine points P1 = (x1, y1, z1) and P2 = (x2, y2, z2), their sum is a point P3 with coordinates:

These formulas are valid also for doubling with the condition P1 = P2.

Extended coordinates
There is another kind of coordinate system with which a point in the Jacobi intersection can be represented. Given the following elliptic curve in the Jacobi intersection form:

the extended coordinates describe a point P = (x, y, z) with the variables X, Y, Z, T, XY, ZT, where:

Sometimes these coordinates are used, because they are more convenient (in terms of time-cost) in some specific situations. For more information about the operations based on the use of these coordinates see http://hyperelliptic.org/EFD/g1p/auto-jintersect-extended.html

Definition: Jacobi quartic

An elliptic curve in Jacobi quartic form can be obtained from the curve Ea,b in the Weierstrass form with at least one point of order 2. The following transformation f sends each point of Ea,b to a point in the Jacobi coordinates, where (X: Y: Z) = (sX: s2Y: sZ).

 f: Ea,b → J
 
 
 

Applying  f to  Ea,b, one obtains a curve in J of the following form:

 

where:

.

are elements in K. C represents an elliptic curve in the Jacobi quartic form, in Jacobi coordinates.

Jacobi quartic in affine coordinates
The general form of a Jacobi quartic curve in affine coordinates is:

,

where often e = 1 is assumed.

Group law
The neutral element of the group law of C is the projective point (0: 1: 1).

Addition and doubling in affine coordinates

As in the Jacobi intersections, also in this case it is possible to use this formula for doubling as well.

Addition and doubling in projective coordinates
Given two points P1 = (X1: Y1: Z1) and P2 = (X2: Y2: Z2) in C′, the coordinates for the point P3 = (X3: Y3: Z3), where P3 = P1 + P2, are given in terms of P1 and P2 by the formulae:

 
 
 

One can use this formula also for doubling, with the condition that P2 = P1: in this way the point P3 = P1 + P1 = [2]P1 is obtained.

The number of multiplications required to add two points is 13 plus 3 multiplications by constants: in particular there are two multiplications by the constant e and one by the constant a.

There are some "strategies" to reduce the operations required for adding and doubling points: the number of multiplications can be decreased to 11 plus 3 multiplications by constants (see  section 3 for more details).

The number of multiplications can be reduced by working on the constants e and d: the elliptic curve in the Jacobi form can be modified in order to have a smaller number of operations for adding and doubling. So, for example, if the constant d in C is significantly small, the multiplication by d can be cancelled; however the best option is to reduce e: if it is small, not only one, but two multiplications are neglected.

Example of addition and doubling
Consider the elliptic curve E4,0, it has a point P of order 2: P = (p, 0) = (0, 0). Therefore, a = 4, b = p = 0 so we have e = 1 and d = 1 and the associated Jacobi quartic form is:

 

 
 
 .

So

.

Using the same formulae, the point P4 = [2]P1 is obtained:

So

.

Negation
The negation of a point P1 = (X1: Y1: Z1) is: −P1 = (−X1: Y1: Z1)

Alternative coordinates for the Jacobi quartic
There are other systems of coordinates that can be used to represent a point in a Jacobi quartic: they are used to obtain fast computations in certain cases. For more information about the time-cost required in the operations with these coordinates see http://hyperelliptic.org/EFD/g1p/auto-jquartic.html

Given an affine Jacobi quartic

the Doubling-oriented XXYZZ coordinates introduce an additional curve parameter c satisfying a2 + c2 = 1 and they represent a point (x, y) as (X, XX, Y, Z, ZZ, R), such that:

the Doubling-oriented XYZ coordinates, with the same additional assumption (a2 + c2 = 1), represent a point (x, y) with (X, Y, Z) satisfying the following equations:

Using the XXYZZ coordinates there is no additional assumption, and they represent a point (x, y) as (X, XX, Y, Z, ZZ) such that:

while the XXYZZR coordinates represent (x, y) as (X, XX, Y, Z, ZZ, R) such that:

with the XYZ coordinates the point (x, y) is given by (X, Y, Z), with:

.

See also
For more information about the running-time required in a specific case, see Table of costs of operations in elliptic curves.

Notes

References
 
 
http://hyperelliptic.org/EFD/index.html

External links
http://hyperelliptic.org/EFD/g1p/index.html

Elliptic curves
Elliptic curve cryptography